Xelibri (pronounced "ex-elibrii") was a fashion-oriented range of mobile phones created by Siemens Mobile and introduced in January 2003. Two "collections" each consisting of four unusual phones, released before the Xelibri project was dropped due to poor sales in 2004. The first Space on Earth (2003 Q2, Xelibri 1 to 4) collection with its Star Trek influences was designed in-house by Siemens whilst the second Fashion Extravaganza (2003 Q4, Xelibri 5 to 8) collection was contracted out to IDEO design.

The Xelibri division was headed by George Appling. Appling said to the media that "sixty percent" of the world don't need Xelibri, and that they are going after the 40 percent "who rank design as their top priority." The initial strategy was two "collections" every year. Although the phones were designed by top designers, marketed as fashion accessories and sold at a high price, the designs were strange and quite detached from what a fashion and style conscious consumer would be looking for in a mobile phone. Xelibri phones also lacked a recognizable brand name, with the highly regarded "SIEMENS" logo only appearing on the battery cover of the phones.

Expensive advertising and well-placed sales stands in department stores did nothing to help the sales figures of the Xelibri range. Although on the outside the designs were eye-catching and experimental, the technology inside the phones was nothing more than low end unsophisticated Siemens models which lacked all but the most basic features (voice and SMS). This, when coupled with strange keypad design, made the phones quite difficult and cumbersome to use.

In May 2004 Siemens dropped the Xelibri range. Only 780,000 units were sold in 2003, less than 2% of Siemens' total handset sales.

Gallery

References

External links
Bang & Olufsen and ELLE pick up where Xelibri failed (Vision Mobile)
The most bizarre phones we have ever seen. (phoneArena.com)
GSM Arena (Xelibri search)
Strategic Management report on Xelibri luxury phones from Siemens

Luxury brands
Siemens mobile phones